Víctor Christopher de Baunbag (born 5 August 2000) is a Spanish footballer who plays as a forward for Spanish club RCD Mallorca B.

Club career
Born in Madrid to Cameroonian parents, de Baunbag was a RCD Mallorca youth graduate, and renewed his contract until 2023 on 8 May 2018.

De Baunbag made his senior debut with the reserves on 21 April 2018, playing the last 18 minutes in a 1–1 Tercera División away draw against UD Ibiza. He scored his first goal on 5 May in a 1–0 away routing of UD Collerense, and scored a hat-trick in a 6–0 home thrashing of CD Llosetense on 2 December.

On 8 June 2019, after scoring 15 goals for the B-team, de Baunbag made his professional debut by coming on as a late substitute for Sergio Buenacasa in a 0–0 away draw against Extremadura UD in the Segunda División.

References

External links
 
 
 

2000 births
Living people
Footballers from Madrid
Spanish people of Cameroonian descent
Spanish sportspeople of African descent
Spanish footballers
Cameroonian footballers
Association football forwards
Segunda División B players
Segunda División players
Tercera División players
Tercera Federación players
RCD Mallorca B players
RCD Mallorca players
UE Cornellà players
UP Langreo footballers